The Liuguanghe Xiqian Expressway Bridge is a 375 metres high cable-stay bridge crossing the Yachi River between Xiuwen, Guiyang, and Qianxi, Bijie in Guizhou, China.

The Liuguanghe Bridge will carry traffic on the Xifeng to Qianxi Expressway. The bridge will have a main span of 580 metres and a total length of 1280 metres. The highest tower is 245 metres high also making it one of the tallest bridges in the world. Although the bridge is officially 375 metres high, that measurement is taken from the original river level. Construction of the Wujiangdu Dam down stream from the bridge has created a reservoir that extents under the bridge reducing the viable height above the water to 300 metres.

See also
 
 
 
 List of bridges in China
 List of bridges in Guizhou
 List of highest bridges

References

http://gz.people.com.cn/n2/2016/0511/c194849-28312430.html

Bridges in Guizhou
Bridges completed in 2017